The Vishva Hindu Parishad (VHP) is an Indian right-wing Hindu organization based on Hindu nationalism. The VHP was founded in 1964 by M. S. Golwalkar and S. S. Apte in collaboration with Swami Chinmayananda. Its stated objective is "to organise, consolidate the Hindu society and to serve and protect the Hindu Dharma". It was established to construct and renovate Hindu temples, and deal with matters of cow slaughter and religious conversion. The VHP is a member of the Sangh Parivar group, the family of Hindu nationalist organisations led by the RSS.

The VHP has been criticized for contributing to violence against Muslims in India, most notably for its role in the demolition of the Babri Masjid in 1992 over the Ayodhya dispute.

History 

The VHP was founded in 1964 by RSS leaders M. S. Golwalkar and S. S. Apte in collaboration with the Hindu spiritual leader Chinmayananda Saraswati. According to Chinmayananda, the objective of the VHP was to awaken Hindus to their place in the comity of nations.

Chinmayananda was nominated as its founding President, while Apte was nominated as its founding General Secretary.  It was decided at the meeting that the name of the proposed organization would be "Vishva Hindu Parishad" and that a world convention of Hindus was to be held at Prayag (Allahabad) during the Kumbh Mela of 1966 for its launch. It was further decided that it would be a non-political organisation and that no office bearer of any political party shall be simultaneously an office bearer in the Parishad. The delegation of the founders also included Bharatiya Vidya Bhavan founder K. M. Munshi, Gujarati scholar Keshavram Kashiram Shastri, Sikh leader Tara Singh, Namdhari Sikh leader Satguru Jagjit Singh and eminent politicians such as C. P. Ramaswami Iyer.

In the mid 1990s, VHP had 1.6 million members worldwide. According to a 2008 estimate, VHP claimed 6.8 million members.

Ideology

The VHP was first mooted at a conference in Pawai, Sandipani Sadhanalaya, Bombay on 29 August 1964. The conference was hosted by RSS chief M. S. Golwalkar. The date was chosen to coincide with the festival of Janmashtami. Several representatives from the Hindu, Sikh, Buddhist and Jain faiths were present in the meeting, as well as the Dalai Lama. Golwalkar explained that "all faiths of Indian origins need to unite", saying that the word "Hindu" (people of "Hindustan") also applied to adherents of all the above religions. Apte declared:

Its main objective is "to organise, consolidate the Hindu society and to serve, protect the Hindu Dharma". It has been involved in social service projects and in encouraging the construction and renovation of Hindu temples. It is against the caste system, and opposes cow slaughter. Defending Hindus around the world and Hindu rights has been one of its stated objectives. The VHP considers Buddhists, Jains and Sikhs as well as native tribal religions as part of the greater Hindu fraternity.

The VHP promotes the education and involvement of members of Hindu diaspora in their "cultural duties and spiritual values." This view was first promoted by Chinmayananda, and is reflected in the promulgation of VHP organizations in Indo-Caribbean countries Trinidad and Tobago, Guyana and Suriname.

The organisation acts under the guidance from Dharma Sansad, a religious parliament of Gurus.

Religious conversion

The VHP is against religious conversion, and uses trained members known as Dharma Prasaar Vibhag (Dharma Propagation Unit) to meet their ends. The VHP also provides means for reconversion back to Hinduism. From 1982 to 1985, over 66,000 people were reconverted to Hinduism following the efforts of VHP.

VHP claimed to have converted 5,000 people to Hinduism in 2002. In 2004, VHP claimed to have converted 12,857 people to Hinduism. 3,727 of these were Muslims and 9,130 were Christians.

In Punjab, the VHP has played an active role to prevent conversions of Sikhs. Majority of them are low caste Sikhs converting to Christianity. This may be a result of oppression by high caste Sikhs but there are considerable free will conversions among the higher class Sikhs too; however, the VHP have forcibly stopped Christian missionaries from converting Sikhs.

VHP engaged in "re-conversion" program in the state of Orissa. In June 2002, VHP converted 143 tribal Christians into Hinduism in Tainser village of Sundergarh district. In 2005, VHP in Bargarh carried out reconversion ceremony for 567 Christians. The new converts had signed affidavits, confirming their intention to change their religion. Another 600 Dalit tribal Christians were converted to Hinduism in Bijepur, Odisha.

In April 2005, in West Bengal members of 45 tribal families converted to Hinduism from Christianity in a ceremony organised by Akhil Bhartiya Sanatan Santhal, allied to VHP.

In March 2021, a Freedom to Religion Bill was passed in Madhya Pradesh, and the VHP plans to organize for action in other states.

Beti Bachao Bahu Lao
 is a campaign planned by the Vishva Hindu Parishad (VHP) and its affiliates Bajrang Dal etc., that claimed to marry young Muslim girls to Hindu men.

In 2016, journalist Rahul Kotiyal of Scroll.in was awarded Ramnath Goenka Award for reporting on a campaign by RSS and Bajrang Dal named "Beti Bachao, Bahu Lao". The campaign attempted to stop Hindu girls from marrying non-Hindus. If RSS members get information of a Hindu girl planning to marry a Muslim man, then the RSS members would track the girl and would inform the parents of the girl accusing this to be a case of Love Jihad.

Litigation

In 2005, after the protests organised by VHP, the Jharkhand Legislative Assembly passed a Cow Protection Commission Bill that made the killing of, cruelty to and illegal trading of cows a crime.

In 2007, VHP had launched nationwide protest against demolition of the Rama Setu. On 12 September 2007, the VHP, with the aid of BJP and the Rameswaram Sreeramsetu Surakshaya Manch, had blocked road and rail traffic in Orissa. Thousands of activists participated in these protests in Bhubaneswar, Jatani, Rourkela, and Sambalpur.

Youth organisations 

The Bajrang Dal founded in 1984, is organised in many states in major training camps called shakhas, where thousands of youths simultaneously train in various activities, receive sports, education in Hindutva and cultural indoctrination. The Durga Vahini, founded in 1991 under the tutelage of Sadhvi Rithambara as its founding chairperson and the support of the VHP, is described as the "female arm of the Dal". Members of the Vahini contend that the portrayal of their group as a branch of the Bajrang Dal is an oversimplification, and that their goals are to "dedicate ourselves to spiritual, physical, mental and knowledge development". The VHP also have divisions made up of women. VHP secretary Giri Raj Kishore charted out highly visible roles for women in the group. He charted out two "satyagrahas" for women during their demonstrations.

The VHP has been a prime backer of the World Hindu Conference in which issues such as casteism, sectarianism, and the future of Hindus were discussed. Prior Conferences have included Hindu Groups such as Parisada Hindu Dharma.

International presence 
Vishwa Hindu Parishad has presence in 29 countries outside of India. The Australia wing of Vishva Hindu Parishad conducts activities such as conducting weekend schools, language classes, cultural workshops, festivals. The festivals are also organised for open to all communities promoting Unity in Diversity. The press release from city council of Holroyd states that Vishva Hindu Parishad is active in supporting multiculturalism in the same region.

Hindu Students Council (also known as HSC) is an organization of Hindu students in the US and Canada. The HSC was set up in 1990 with support from the Vishwa Hindu Parishad of America. Although the HSC says that it became fully independent in 2003, its association with that body was a matter of some debate.  Prior to its separation from its parent organization, it was considered to be the student-wing of the VHP.

Violence

The VHP has been associated with violence on a number of occasions.

The VHP had been aggressively involved in the Ayodhya dispute over the Ram Janmabhoomi, or Babri Masjid before its demolition, since March 1984, after getting encouraged by the strong response it had got from ekatmata yatra programme, it organised in 1983, which was aimed at Hindu unity and self-protection against Islam and Christianity. This activity in the Ayodhya issue involved demonstrations, petitions and litigation, along with militant processions, forceful conversion ceremonies and incidents of violence and vandalism, particularly targeting Muslims. The VHP is also said to have sought the destruction of the Babri mosque. According to the VHP and its affiliated organisations, the Babri Mosque was built by demolishing the temple at the birthplace of Rama (Ram Janmabhoomi) by the Mughal Emperor Babur in early 16th century. It further stated in Allahabad court documentation that the building was in a dilapidated condition. It was in ruins and could not be used for worship or any activities. In 1989 , the VHP, keeping in view the impending Loksabha elections, organized a massive movement to start the construction of a Ram temple at the disputed site. The BJP-VHP organized a huge rally of 200000 volunteers at this site on 6 December, 1992 and set out to demolish the mosque.

According to the Human Rights Watch, the VHP and Bajrang Dal, in collaboration with BJP had been involved in 2002 Gujarat riots. Though VHP has denied these claims, VHP spokesman Kaushikbahi Mehta said, "We in the VHP had nothing to do with the violence except to take care of widows and victims of the Godhra mayhem."

In 2015, VHP defended the demolition of a church in Haryana, although it has denied involvement in the incident. VHP joint general secretary Surendra Jain alleged that the church was built "for the purpose of aggressive conversion" and likened its destruction to the violence of the 1857 war which he claimed "was fought for the cause of religion".

On 4 June 2018, the VHP was classified as a militant religious organization by the CIA in its World Factbooks entry for India, under the category of political pressure groups, along with Bajrang Dal. The VHP reportedly explored legal options to have this tag removed. The World Factbook removed the mentions of the VHP and the Bajrang Dal from the entry by 25 June 2018.

Controversies
On 15th August, BJP Government in Gujarat released 4 rapist who raped 5 months pregnant Bilkis Bano during 2002 Gujarat Riots.
These 4 rapist were greeted with garlands at VHP Office in Gujarat.

References

Bibliography

External links 

 

 

 
1964 establishments in Delhi
Religious organizations established in 1964
Organizations established in 1964
Hindutva
Hindu nationalism
Hindu organizations
Hindu organisations based in India
Hindu paramilitary organizations
Fascist movements 
Fascist organizations 
Neo-fascist organizations 
Political masks
Volunteer organisations in India
Right-wing populism in India
Sangh Parivar
Anti-LGBT sentiment
Organizations that oppose LGBT rights
Anti-communist organizations
Anti-communism in India
Hinduism-related controversies
Anti-Islam sentiment in India